Iwasaki Tsunemasa also Kan-en ( or , 1786–1842) was a Japanese botanist, zoologist and entomologist. He was also a samurai in the service of the Tokugawa shogunate.

He wrote:

 Bukō-sanbutsu-shi a work on the natural history of the Edo district including botany zoology and entomology as lists.
 Honzō Zufu (Iconographia Plantarum or Diagrams and Chronicles of Botany) a woodblock illustrated work (1828, 1884, 1920, 1921 in 93 volumes). Plants only.
 Honzō Sen'yō (Essentials to the study of plants and animals). Unpublished. Two volumes includes insects and gives some Dutch names. Some editions include the Binomial nomenclature introduced by Carl Linnaeus in 1758.
 Sōmoku-sodategusa (Cultivation of Flowering Plants). Two volumes of woodcut illustrations (1818).Includes 13 Ukiyo-e of insects which cause plant damage. One was Papilio xuthus which fed on fragrant citrus. He described the larva with its osmeterium.

External links 
 Kew Gallery of Kan'en Iwasaki
 Honzō Zufu images (1830 and 1844 edition) at National Diet Library
 Honzō Zufu images at University of Tokyo

References 

Ueno Masuzo (year?) Japanese entomology in the first half of the nineteenth century Japanese journal of entomology
Vol.27, No.1(19590315) pp. 4–9 The Entomological Society of Japan 

Japanese entomologists
1786 births
1842 deaths
Botanical illustrators